Brown Gravy is a 1929 American comedy  film with an African American cast. William Watson directed the Al Christie production. It was among the early "talkie" films released with African American casts. Octavus Roy Cohen wrote the story, part of a series he wrote for the Saturday Evening Post adapted to film in collaboration with Christie. The film's thin plot includes themes addressing religion, fraternal organizations, con men, and family life.

The New York Public Library has photos used in promoting the film including caricatures of the leads. The film features a singing contest between choral groups in Memphis.

Cast
Spencer Williams
Roberta Hyson
Sam McDaniel
Edward Thompson
Evelyn Preer
The Georgia Jubilee Singers

References

1929 comedy films
1929 films
American comedy films
1920s American films